Víctor José Reyes (born October 5, 1994) is a Venezuelan professional baseball outfielder in the Chicago White Sox organization. He has played in Major League Baseball (MLB) for the Detroit Tigers. He made his MLB debut in 2018.

Career

Atlanta Braves
The Atlanta Braves signed Reyes as an international free agent in July 2011. He made his professional debut in 2012 with the DSL Braves where he batted .296 with 33 runs batted in (RBIs) and 12 stolen bases in 52 games. He spent 2013 with both the Gulf Coast League Braves and Danville Braves, slashing .342/.387/.409 with 25 RBIs in 49 games, and 2014 with the Rome Braves where he compiled a .259 batting average with 34 RBIs in 89 games.

Arizona Diamondbacks
In April 2015, the Braves traded Reyes to the Arizona Diamondbacks for the 75th pick in the 2015 MLB draft. This draft pick was used by the Braves to select pitcher A.J. Minter. 

Arizona assigned Reyes to the Kane County Cougars and he spent the whole season there, slashing .311/.343/.389 with two home runs and 59 RBIs in 121 games. In 2016, he played for the Visalia Rawhide where he batted .303 with six home runs and 54 RBIs in 124 games, and in 2017, he played with the Jackson Generals where he hit .292 with four home runs, 51 RBIs, 29 doubles, 59 runs scored, and 18 stolen bases. After the 2017 season, he played for the Salt River Rafters of the Arizona Fall League, where he hit .316 and scored eight runs and was selected to the Arizona Fall League's Rising Stars Team.

Detroit Tigers 

On December 14, 2017, the Detroit Tigers selected Reyes from the Arizona Diamondbacks organization with the first selection of the 2017 Rule 5 draft. Reyes made the Tigers' 2018 Opening Day 25-man roster. Reyes made his major league debut with the Tigers on April 1, but left the game early after a spike cut his arm. Through the first half of the season, Reyes played sparingly, primarily serving as a pinch runner for Víctor Martínez or as a late-inning defensive replacement. Through the 2018 All-Star break, Reyes was hitting .221 in only 96 plate appearances. On September 2, Reyes hit his first career major league home run, a solo shot off Sonny Gray of the New York Yankees. Reyes also went 4-for-5 in the contest for his first career four-hit game. He would finish the 2018 season hitting .222 with 1 home run in 212 at-bats. He also stole 9 bases in 10 attempts.

On March 14, 2019 the Tigers sent Reyes to the Toledo Mud Hens to begin the 2019 season. After hitting .302 in Toledo with nine home runs and 55 RBIs in 65 games, Reyes was recalled to the Tigers on July 4. In 276 at-bats for the Tigers, Reyes hit .304 with three home runs and 25 RBIs.

In the shortened 2020 season, Reyes primarily batted leadoff for the Tigers. In 57 games, he hit .277 with four home runs and 14 RBIs, while stealing eight bases in 10 attempts.

Reyes made the Tigers 2021 opening day roster. On May 8, he was optioned to Triple-A Toledo after hitting just .143 in 63 at-bats. Reyes was recalled to the MLB roster on May 24. On August 27, 2021, Reyes hit a pinch-hit inside-the-park home run, becoming the first MLB player to do so since Tyler Saladino on May 14, 2018, and the first Tigers player to do since Ben Oglivie on June 2, 1976. In 76 games at the major league level in 2021, Reyes hit .258 with 5 home runs.

On March 22, 2022, the Tigers and Reyes agreed on a one-year contract worth $1.4 million, avoiding arbitration.

On November 10, 2022, the Tigers outrighted Reyes off the 40-man roster and Reyes rejected the outright assignment to Triple-A, instead opting for Free Agency.

Chicago White Sox 
On December 10, 2022, Reyes signed a minor league contract with the Chicago White Sox.

See also
 List of Major League Baseball players from Venezuela
 Rule 5 draft results

References

External links

1994 births
Detroit Tigers players
Danville Braves players
Dominican Summer League Braves players
Venezuelan expatriate baseball players in the Dominican Republic
Kane County Cougars players
Jackson Generals (Southern League) players
Leones del Caracas players
Living people
Major League Baseball outfielders
Major League Baseball players from Venezuela
Venezuelan expatriate baseball players in the United States
People from Barcelona, Venezuela
Rome Braves players
Salt River Rafters players
Toledo Mud Hens players
Visalia Rawhide players